Pardachirus is a genus of soles mainly native to coastal water in the Indo-Pacific. A single species, P. poropterus is restricted to estuaries and lower sections of freshwater streams. At least some species in the genus are toxic.

Species
There are currently six recognized species in this genus:
 Pardachirus balius J. E. Randall & Mee, 1994 (Piebald sole)
 Pardachirus hedleyi J. D. Ogilby, 1916 (Southern peacock sole)
 Pardachirus marmoratus (Lacépède, 1802) (Finless sole)
 Pardachirus morrowi (Chabanaud, 1954) (Persian carpet sole)
 Pardachirus pavoninus (Lacépède, 1802) (Peacock sole)
 Pardachirus poropterus (Bleeker, 1851) (Estuary sole)

References

Soleidae
Ray-finned fish genera
Taxa named by Albert Günther